The Hawaii Five-0 and Magnum P.I. crossover is a two-part crossover event between Hawaii Five-0 and Magnum P.I. that aired on CBS. The event aired on January 3, 2020, with the Hawaii Five-0 episode "Ihea 'oe i ka wa a ka ua e loku ana?" which is Hawaiian for "Where were you when the rain was pouring?", followed by the  Magnum P.I. episode "Desperate Measures". Jay Hernandez, Perdita Weeks, Zachary Knighton, Stephen Hill, Meaghan Rath, Katrina Law, and Beulah Koale appeared in both parts of the event as Thomas Magnum, Juliet Higgins, Orville "Rick" Wright, Theodore "TC" Calvin, Tani Rey, Quinn Liu, and Junior Reigns, respectively (Melissa Tang also guest starred in both parts as Erin Hong).

Cast and characters

Main
The following contains a list of actors receiving main billing in the crossover event:

Guests
The following contains a list of notable guests appearing in the crossover event:

Plot

Part 1: "Ihea 'oe i ka wa a ka ua e loku ana?"
McGarrett and the task force track down a suspect who might be connected to the stolen list of undercover CIA agents. When the suspect gets away, the task force run into Thomas Magnum and his partner, Higgins and discover that they are looking for the same suspect for a client they are looking after. McGarrett reluctantly begins working with Magnum and his team to try to find the stolen list. Meanwhile, Tani reaches out to Adam concerning about his wellbeing only for Adam to flee Hawaii. Also, after getting advice from Higgins, Tani asks Junior out on a date only to get kidnapped by thugs.

Part 2: "Desperate Measures"
When Hong, a man that Magnum and Higgins are monitoring for a client, gets shot and killed and his killer escapes, the team from Hawaii Five-0 gets involved. Magnum, Higgins, TC and Rick assist as the group recovers a secret list of CIA double-agents. Soon after, Junior Reigns is kidnapped as leverage for the criminals to get the list back, leading to Magnum's team helping Tani Rey and Quinn Liu in a search-and-rescue mission.

Production
Before the crossover, Hawaii Five-0 characters had crossed over to Magnum P.I., such as Kamekona (Taylor Wily), Duke (Dennis Chun), Noelani (Kimee Balmilero), Flippa (Shawn Mokuahi Garnett) and P.I. Harry Brown (William Forsythe). The showrunner for both shows, Peter M. Lenkov, had wanted to include MacGyver (also showrunned by Lenkov) in the crossover, but eventually it was decided to just do a Hawaii Five-0 and Magnum P.I. crossover.

Reception

Critical response
Dale McGarrigle with TV Fanatic said "Finally, a crossover that felt genuinely organic." and gave the episode an editorial rating of 4.5 out of 5 stars.

Viewing figures

United States
In the United States the first part of the crossover was watched live by 8.06 million viewers. Within seven days, the episode was watched by a total of 10.56 million viewers. The second part was watched live by 7.83 million viewers. Within seven days, the episode was watched by a total of 10.38 million viewers.

Notes

References

2020 American television episodes
Hawaii Five-0 (2010 TV series) episodes
Magnum, P.I.
Television crossover episodes